The platform of the Democratic Party of the United States is generally based on American liberalism, contrasting with the conservatism of the Republican Party. The party has large centrist and progressive wings, as well as smaller fiscal conservative and democratic socialist elements.

Democratic platforms seek to promote social programs, labor unions, consumer protection, workplace safety regulation, equal opportunity, disability rights, racial equity, regulations against environmental pollution, and criminal justice reform. Democrats tend to support abortion rights and the LGBT community, as well as a pathway to citizenship for undocumented immigrants. Democrats typically agree with the scientific consensus on climate change and favor a multilateral approach in foreign policy.

Economic issues 

Equal economic opportunity, a robust social safety net, and strong labor unions have historically been at the heart of Democratic economic policy. The party favors a mixed economy and generally supports a progressive tax system, higher minimum wages, Social Security, universal health care, public education, and subsidized housing. It also supports infrastructure development and clean energy investments to achieve economic development and job creation. Since the 1990s, the party has occasionally supported centrist economic reforms that cut the size of government and reduced market regulations.

Fiscal policy 

Democrats support a more progressive tax structure to provide more services and reduce economic inequality by making sure that the wealthiest Americans pay the highest tax rate. They also support more government spending on social services while spending less on the military. They oppose cutting social services, such as Social Security, Medicare, and Medicaid, believing cuts to be harmful to efficiency and social justice. Democrats believe the benefits of social services include a more productive labor force and that the benefits of this are greater than any benefits that could be derived from lower taxes, especially on top earners. Furthermore, Democrats view social services as essential to providing positive freedom (i.e., freedom derived from economic opportunity). The Democratic-led House of Representatives reinstated the PAYGO (pay-as-you-go) budget rule early in the 110th Congress.

Minimum wage 

Democrats favor raising the minimum wage and believe that all Americans have the right to a fair wage. They call for a $15.00/hour national minimum wage and believe that the minimum wage should be adjusted regularly. The Fair Minimum Wage Act of 2007 was an early component of the party's agenda during the 110th Congress. In 2006, Democrats supported six state ballot initiatives to increase the minimum wage; all six initiatives passed.

Health care 

Democrats call for "affordable and quality health care" and favor moving toward universal health care in a variety of forms to address rising healthcare costs. Some Democratic politicians favor a single-payer program or Medicare for All, while others prefer creating a public health insurance option.

The Patient Protection and Affordable Care Act (also known as "Obamacare"), which President Barack Obama signed into law on March 23, 2010, has been one of the most significant pushes for universal health care. As of December 2019, more than 20 million Americans have gained health insurance under the Affordable Care Act.

Education 

Democrats favor improving public education by raising school standards and reforming the Head Start program. They also support universal preschool and expanding access to primary education (some Democrats who support this through charter schools). They call for slashes in student loan debt and support reforms to force down tuition fees. Other proposed reforms have included nationwide universal preschool education, tuition-free or reduced-tuition college, and reforms of standardized testing. Democrats have the long-term aim of having low-cost, publicly funded college education with low tuition fees (like in much of Europe and Canada), which should be available to every eligible American student. Alternatively, they encourage expanding access to post-secondary education by increasing state funding for student financial aid such as Pell Grants and college tuition tax deductions.

Environment 

Democrats believe that the government should protect the environment and have a history of environmentalism. In more recent years, this stance has had as its emphasis alternative energy generation as the basis for an improved economy, greater national security, and general environmental benefits.

Democrats also favor expanding conservation lands, and they encourage open space and rail travel to relieve highway and airport congestion and improve air quality and economy; they "believe that communities, environmental interests, and government should work together to protect resources while ensuring the vitality of local economies. Once Americans were led to believe they had to make a choice between the economy and the environment. They now know this is a false choice."

The Democratic party's foremost environmental concern is climate change. Democrats, most notably former Vice President Al Gore, have pressed for stern regulation of greenhouse gases. On October 15, 2007, Gore won the Nobel Peace Prize for his efforts to build greater knowledge about man-made climate change and laying the foundations for the measures needed to counteract it. A 2017 analysis by the Center for American Progress Action Fund of climate change denial in the U.S. Congress found that 180 members deny the science behind climate change, all Republicans, and that no Democratic members of Congress publicly denied climate change.

Renewable energy and fossil fuels 

Democrats support increased domestic renewable energy development, including wind and solar power farms, in an effort to reduce carbon pollution. The party's platform calls for an "all of the above" energy policy including clean energy, natural gas, and domestic oil, while wanting to become energy independent. The party has supported higher taxes on oil companies and increased regulations on coal power plants, favoring a policy of reducing long-term reliance on fossil fuels. In addition, the party supports stricter fuel emissions standards to prevent air pollution.

Trade agreements 

The 2012 Democratic Party platform endorses fair and free trade, the KORUS FTA, the TPP, the Panama–United States Trade Promotion Agreement, the CTPA, and the Interagency Trade Enforcement Center.

Social issues 

The modern Democratic Party emphasizes social equality and equal opportunity. Democrats support voting rights and minority rights, including LGBT rights. The party passed the Civil Rights Act of 1964 after a Democratic attempt to filibuster led by southern Democrats, which for the first time outlawed segregation. Carmines and Stimson wrote "the Democratic Party appropriated racial liberalism and assumed federal responsibility for ending racial discrimination."

Ideological social elements in the party include cultural liberalism, civil libertarianism, and feminism. Some Democratic social policies are immigration reform, electoral reform, and women's reproductive rights.

Equal Opportunity 
The Democratic Party strives for equality of opportunity for all Americans regardless of sex, age, race, ethnicity, sexual orientation, gender identity, religion, creed, or national origin. Many Democrats support affirmative action programs to further this goal. Democrats also strongly support the Americans with Disabilities Act to prohibit discrimination against people based on physical or mental disability. As such, they pushed the ADA Amendments Act of 2008, a disability rights expansion that became law.

Voting rights 
The 2012 Democratic Party platform believes the right to vote and to have one's vote counted is an essential American freedom, and opposes laws placing unnecessary restrictions on those seeking to exercise that freedom, such as voter ID laws. Many Democrats also support automatic voter registration, which ensures that all Americans over the legal voting age are registered to vote upon reaching the aforementioned age, and are never required to re-register.

Abortion and reproductive rights 

The 2012 Democratic Party platform endorses maintaining Roe v. Wade, a woman's right to make decisions regarding her pregnancy, including a safe and legal abortion, regardless of ability to pay, and a woman's decision to have a child by providing affordable health care and ensuring the availability of and access to programs helping women during pregnancy and after a child's birth, including caring adoption programs, along with opposing any and all efforts to weaken or undermine that right.

Immigration 

The 2012 Democratic Party platform endorses enacting comprehensive immigration reform supporting American economic goals and reflects America's values as both a nation of laws and a nation of immigrants. They generally support an easier path toward citizenship for immigrants, a system for allocating visas meeting economic needs, keeps families together, and enforces the law. The party supported the immigration policy of the Obama administration, the DREAM Act, the Deferred Action for Childhood Arrivals program, and opposes state laws targeting immigrants. Democrats are generally more sympathetic to sanctuary cities.

LGBT rights 

The 2012 Democratic Party platform endorsed the principle that no one should face discrimination based on their gender, sexual orientation, and gender identity, such as transgender, gay, lesbian and/or bisexual. They support the Employment Non-Discrimination Act, anti-bullying prevention for LGBT youth, the Don't Ask, Don't Tell Repeal Act of 2010, and the Matthew Shepard and James Byrd Jr. Hate Crimes Prevention Act. Democrats also supported President Obama's presidential memorandum on April 15, 2010, granting patients to receive visitors and to designate surrogate decision makers for medical emergencies, the U.S. Customs and Border Protection's March 29, 2012, update of the Customs Declarations Form that same-sex couples and their children can go through Customs when re-entering the country together instead of being forced to split up, marriage equality, and the Respect for Marriage Act. Support for the Obama administration policy requiring American diplomats must raise the issue wherever harassment or abuse arises, and they are required to record it in the State Department's annual report on human rights, and the United States Department of State funding a program financing LGBT rights organizations to combat discrimination, violence, and other abuses is also present. Since 2011, the party opposed the Defense of Marriage Act. The party also opposes discriminatory federal and state constitutional amendments and other attempts to deny equal protection of the laws to committed same-sex couples seeking the same respect and responsibilities as other married couples, and efforts by other nations criminalizing homosexual conduct or ignore abuse.

Legal issues

Gun control 

With a stated goal of reducing crime and homicide, the Democratic Party has introduced various gun control measures, most notably the Gun Control Act of 1968, the Brady Bill of 1993, and Crime Control Act of 1994. However, some Democrats, especially rural, Southern, and Western Democrats, favor fewer restrictions on firearm possession and warned that the party was defeated in the 2000 presidential election in rural areas because of the issue. In the national platform for 2008, the only statement explicitly favoring gun control was a plan calling for renewal of the 1994 Assault Weapons Ban.

Death penalty 

The Democratic Party currently opposes the death penalty, but previously supported it.
The 2012 Democratic Party platform endorsed the death penalty, but believed it must not be arbitrary, DNA testing should be used in all appropriate circumstances, defendants should have effective assistance of counsel, and the administration of justice should be fair and impartial.

As of March 2015, 77% of Republicans, 57% of Independents, and 40% of Democrats said they favored the death penalty. 17% of Republicans, 37% of Independents, and 56% of Democrats said they opposed capital punishment.

Torture 
Many Democrats are opposed to the use of torture against individuals apprehended and held prisoner by the U.S. military, and hold that categorizing such prisoners as unlawful combatants does not release the U.S. from its obligations under the Geneva Conventions. Democrats contend that torture is inhumane, decreases the United States' moral standing in the world, and produces questionable results. According to a 2014 poll, most Democrats did not think that waterboarding and other aggressive interrogation tactics were justified.

Torture became a very divisive issue in the party after Barack Obama was elected president. Many centrist Democrats and members of the party's leadership supported the use of torture while the more left-leaning wings continued to be steadfastly opposed to it.

Right to privacy 
The Democratic Party believes that individuals should have a right to privacy. For example, many Democrats have opposed the NSA warrantless surveillance of U.S. citizens.

Some Democratic officeholders have championed consumer protection laws that limit the sharing of consumer data between corporations. Democrats oppose "sodomy laws" and believe that government should not regulate consensual noncommercial sexual conduct among adults as a matter of personal privacy.

Patriot Act 
Many Democrats are opposed to the Patriot Act. However, when the law was passed most Democrats were supportive of it and all but two Democrats in the U.S. Senate voted for the original legislation in 2001. The lone nay vote was from Russ Feingold of Wisconsin; Mary Landrieu of Louisiana did not vote. In the House, the Democrats voted for the Act by a margin of 145–62. Democrats split on the issue of the Act's renewal in 2006. In the Senate, 34 Democrats voted for the 2006 renewal, and 9 against. In the House, 66 Democrats voted for the renewal, and 124 against

Foreign policy issues 
In foreign policy, the voters of the two major parties have largely overlapped since the 1990s. The Gallup poll in early 2013 shows broad agreement on the top issues, albeit with some divergence regarding as human rights and international cooperation through agencies such as the UN.

In June 2014 the Quinnipiac Poll asked Americans which foreign policy they preferred:
A) The United States is doing too much in other countries around the world, and it is time to do less around the world and focus more on our own problems here at home. B) The United States must continue to push forward to promote democracy and freedom in other countries around the world because these efforts make our own country more secure.

Democrats chose A over B by 65–32%; Republicans chose A over B by 56% to 39%; independents chose A over B by 67% to 29%.

Iraq War 

In 2002, Congressional Democrats were divided on the Authorization for Use of Military Force Against Iraq; 147 voted against it (21 in the Senate and 126 in the House) and 110 voted for it (29 in the Senate, 81 in the House). Since then, many prominent Democrats, such as former Senator John Edwards, have expressed regret about this decision, and have called it a mistake, while others, such as Senator Hillary Clinton have criticized the conduct of the war but did not repudiate their initial vote for it (though Clinton later went on to do so during the party's 2008 presidential primaries). Referring to Iraq, in April 2007, Senate Majority Leader Harry Reid declared the war to be "lost" while other Democrats (especially during the 2004 presidential election cycle) accused President Bush of lying to the public about WMDs in Iraq. Among lawmakers, Democrats are the most vocal opponents of Operation Iraqi Freedom and campaigned on a platform of withdrawal ahead of the 2006 mid-term elections.

A March 2003 CBS News poll taken a few days before the invasion of Iraq found that 34% of Democrats nationwide would support it without United Nations backing, 51% would support it only with its backing, and 14% would not support it at all. The Los Angeles Times stated in early April 2003 that 70% of Democrats supported the decision to invade while 27% opposed it. The Pew Research Center stated in August 2007 that opposition increased from 37% during the initial invasion to 74%. In April 2008, a CBS News poll found that about 90% of Democrats disapproved of the Bush administration's conduct and want to end the war within the next year.

Democrats in the House of Representatives near-unanimously supported a non-binding resolution disapproving of President Bush's decision to send additional troops into Iraq in 2007. Congressional Democrats overwhelmingly supported military funding legislation that included a provision that set "a timeline for the withdrawal of all US combat troops from Iraq" by March 31, 2008, but also would leave combat forces in Iraq for purposes such as targeted counter-terrorism operations. After a veto from the president, and a failed attempt in Congress to override the veto, the U.S. Troop Readiness, Veterans' Care, Katrina Recovery, and Iraq Accountability Appropriations Act, 2007 was passed by Congress and signed by the president after the timetable was dropped. Criticism of the Iraq War subsided after the Iraq War troop surge of 2007 led to a dramatic decrease in Iraqi violence. The Democratic-controlled 110th Congress continued to fund efforts in both Iraq and Afghanistan. Presidential candidate Barack Obama advocated a withdrawal of combat troops within Iraq by late 2010 with a residual force of peacekeeping troops left in place. He stated that both the speed of withdrawal and the number of troops left over would be "entirely conditions-based."

On February 27, 2009, President Obama announced, "As a candidate for president, I made clear my support for a timeline of 16 months to carry out this drawdown, while pledging to consult closely with our military commanders upon taking office to ensure that we preserve the gains we've made and protect our troops ... Those consultations are now complete, and I have chosen a timeline that will remove our combat brigades over the next 18 months." Around 50,000 non-combat related forces will remain. Obama's plan drew wide bipartisan support, including that of defeated Republican Presidential candidate Senator John McCain.

Iran sanctions 

The Democratic Party has been critical of Iran's nuclear weapon program and supported economic sanctions against the Iranian government. In 2013, the Democratic led administration worked to reach a diplomatic agreement with the government of Iran to halt the Iranian nuclear weapon program in exchange for international economic sanction relief. As of 2014 negotiations had been successful and the party called for more cooperation with Iran in the future. In 2015, the Obama administration agreed to the Joint Comprehensive Plan of Action, which provides sanction relief in exchange for international oversight of the Iranian nuclear program.

Invasion of Afghanistan 

Democrats in the House of Representatives and in the Senate near-unanimously voted for the Authorization for Use of Military Force Against Terrorists against "those responsible for the recent attacks launched against the United States" in Afghanistan in 2001, supporting the NATO coalition invasion of the nation. Most elected Democrats continue to support the Afghanistan conflict, and some, such as a Democratic National Committee spokesperson, have voiced concerns that the Iraq War shifted too many resources away from the presence in Afghanistan. Since 2006, then-candidate Barack Obama called for a "surge" of troops into Afghanistan and, since 2008, Republican candidate John McCain also called for a "surge". As President, Obama sent a "surge" force of additional troops to Afghanistan. Troop levels were at 94,000 in December 2011, and are decreasing as of recent years, with a target of 68,000 by fall 2012. Obama planned to bring all the troops home by 2014.

Support for the war among the American people has diminished over time, and many Democrats have changed their opinion and now oppose a continuation of the conflict. In July 2008, Gallup found that 41% of Democrats called the invasion a "mistake" while a 55% majority disagreed; in contrast, Republicans were more supportive of the war. The survey described Democrats as evenly divided about whether or not more troops should be sent—56% support it if it would mean removing troops from Iraq and only 47% support it otherwise. A CNN survey in August 2009 stated that a majority of Democrats now oppose the war. CNN polling director Keating Holland said, "Nearly two thirds of Republicans support the war in Afghanistan. Three quarters of Democrats oppose the war." An August 2009 Washington Post poll found similar results, and the paper stated that Obama's policies would anger his closest supporters.

Israel and Palestine 

The 2012 Democratic Party platform endorses maintaining commitment to Israel's security, claiming a strong and secure Israel is vital because of strategic interests and common values, the Obama administration providing nearly $10 billion to Israel in the past three years, military support for Israel, such as the Iron Dome system, the Egypt–Israel peace treaty, the Israel–Jordan peace treaty, and recognizing Jerusalem as and remains the capital of Israel, and opposes any attempt to delegitimize Israel on the world stage. The platform also states that Democratic Party seeks peace between Israelis and Palestinians, and supports a two-state solution, under conditions that Israel's security concerns are met and any Palestinian partner must recognize Israel's right to exist, reject violence, and adhere to existing agreements.

See also 
Political positions of the Republican Party
Democratic Party (United States)#Political positions
History of the United States Democratic Party
Factions in the Democratic Party

Notes

References 

Democratic Party (United States)